Sideroxylon altamiranoi is a species of plant in the family Sapotaceaey. It is endemic to two states of Mexico:  Querétaro and Hidalgo.

References

altamiranoi
Endemic flora of Mexico
Trees of Querétaro
Trees of Hidalgo (state)
Vulnerable plants
Taxonomy articles created by Polbot